The qualifying singles of the 2011 Aegon International took place from June 13th to 18th, 2011 in Eastbourne, Great Britain.

Players

Seeds

Qualifiers

Qualifying draw

First qualifier

Second qualifier

Third qualifier

Fourth qualifier

References

Qualifying
Aegon International - qualifying